Egbedore is a Local Government Area in Osun State, Nigeria. Its headquarters are in the town of Awo at.

It has an area of 270 km and a population of 74,435 at the 2006 census.

The postal code of the area is 232.

References

Local Government Areas in Osun State